Thossaphol Yodchan is a professional footballer from Thailand. He is currently playing as a  left-winger for Thai League 3 club Banbueng, on loan from Pattaya Dolphins United.

External links
 

1986 births
Living people
Thossaphol Yodchan
Association football forwards
Thossaphol Yodchan
Thossaphol Yodchan
Thossaphol Yodchan
Thossaphol Yodchan